Alexei Yurievich Yegorov (May 21, 1975 – March 2, 2002) was a Russian professional ice hockey right winger. He played 11 games in the National Hockey League with the San Jose Sharks between 1995 and 1997.

Playing career

Yegorov played eleven games in the National Hockey League in 1995–96 and 1996–97 for the San Jose Sharks, scoring three goals and three assists for six points. He scored all three of his goals in the same game for a hat trick against the Calgary Flames on February 20, 1996. In addition to the San Jose Sharks, Yegorov also played for the Kansas City Blades and Long Beach Ice Dogs of the IHL, the Kentucky Thoroughblades of the AHL, the Fort Worth Fire of the CHL, HC Dynamo Moscow of the RSL and SKA Saint Petersburg. He last played in the DEL for the Schwenningen Wild Wings.

Death

Yegorov died being beaten by drug dealers on March 2, 2002.

Career statistics

Regular season and playoffs

See also
List of ice hockey players who died during their playing career

References

External links

1975 births
2002 deaths
Adirondack IceHawks players
Fort Worth Fire players
HC Dynamo Moscow players
Kansas City Blades players
Kentucky Thoroughblades players
Lokomotiv Yaroslavl players
Long Beach Ice Dogs (IHL) players
Russian ice hockey right wingers
San Jose Sharks draft picks
San Jose Sharks players
Schwenninger Wild Wings players
SKA Saint Petersburg players
Ice hockey people from Saint Petersburg